So You Think You Can Dance: The Next Generation is the 13th season of So You Think You Can Dance, an American dance competition show. The show premiered on Monday, May 30, 2016, in a new format featuring dancers between ages 8 to 13 at the time of their auditions. The season was broadcast on Fox in the United States, one show each week on Mondays, as it was the previous season. The top prize remained $250,000, and Cat Deeley continued as host.

Auditions were held in Los Angeles, CA, Chicago, IL and New York City. 100 dancers were selected by the judges for the Dance Academy portion of the season, in which 10 contestants were selected by, and paired with, "all-stars" from previous seasons, who mentored and performed with them during the live performance episodes.

Judges
Series creator and executive producer Nigel Lythgoe, along with new permanent members Paula Abdul and Jason Derulo, returned as members of the permanent judging panel and judge the audition rounds. After this, the fourth judge, dancer Maddie Ziegler, who was then 13 years old, joined the show.

Format
Season 13 featured a significant shift in format in that the contestants were all between the ages of 8 and 13 at the time of their auditions. Approximately 100 dancers were selected from the auditions for the next segment of the season, the Dance Academy.  From these, the top 50 were chosen, and finally the top 10 were selected as contestants by a So You Think You Can Dance "all-star" who provided mentorship during the live shows and participated as a duet partner with his or her contestant in performances.

Auditions
Open auditions for season 13 were held in three cities beginning in February 2016.

During the audition round, the judges interviewed each auditioner, watched a brief audition and gave feedback, while the auditioner's family sat at the side of the stage and often participated in the interviews. Offstage, Cat Deeley chatted with contestants and judges. Approximately 100 dancers were sent through to the academy.

Dance Academy
Dance Academy week was split among two episodes. The June 20 episode covered the first day of the academy. The first task for the 10 all-stars was to watch solo dances by each of the contestants were sent through from the auditions.  From these, each all-star selected five dancers (at least three from their own dance style), from the large number of auditioners, to join their "team". If a dancer was selected by more than one all-star, he or she could choose which all-star's team to join. Choreographer Warren Carlyle and the all-stars then taught the 50 remaining competitors a Broadway couples dance routine in 90 minutes, and dancers from each team were paired with dancers from another team. After all of the couples danced, each all-star was required to cut one dancer from his or her team, leaving a total of 40 contestants. Throughout the episode, Maddie Ziegler and Cat Deeley interviewed successful competitors.

The June 27 episode covered days two and three of academy week. On day two, the all-stars each narrowed down their teams to three and then two dancers, based first on a hip-hop routine for pairs choreographed by Tabitha and Napoleon D'umo, and then on a contemporary routine, created by Travis Wall, danced simultaneously by the remaining three members of each team. On the last day, the last two dancers from each team danced a solo just for their own all-star. Each all-star then selected one contestant, making a total of 10 contestants that he or she will mentor through the finals round. The all-stars and their contestants are:

Contemporary
Kathryn McCormick: season 6, 3rd place – Tate
Robert Roldan: season 7, 3rd place – J. T.
Sasha Mallory: season 8 runner-up – Jordan 
Ballroom
Jenna Johnson: season 10, top 8 – Jake
Paul Karmiryan, season 10, top 6 – Ruby
Jonathan Platero, season 5, top 16 – Daniela

Tap
Gaby Diaz, season 12 winner – Emma 
Hip-Hop
Marko Germar°, season 8, top 3 (replacing Joshua Allen) – Sheaden
Comfort Fedoke, season 4, top 8 – Tahani 
 Du-Shaunt "Fik-Shun" Stegall, season 10 winner – Kida
°Although Marko competed in season 8 as a contemporary/jazz dancer, he stepped in, before the first live show, to mentor hip-hop dancer Sheaden after Joshua withdrew from the show.

Finals

Top 10 Contestants

Elimination chart

Performances

Top 10 (July 11, 2016)
The live shows were all two-hour broadcasts. The first live show, on July 11, 2016, opened with a group dance by all ten contestants dancing with their all-stars and all together, futuristically dressed in white. In the middle of the show there was a contemporary group dance by the all-stars, and the show ended with a group hip-hop dance by all of the top-ten contestants. During the show, each contestant performed one solo and one duet with his or her all-star; both dances were in the contestant's primary dance style. At the beginning of the show, host Cat Deeley announced that all-star Joshua Allen has been replaced by Marko Germar, to mentor and partner with hip-hop dancer Sheaden Gabriel. Maddie Ziegler observed the contestants' rehearsals and joined the judging panel, during the broadcast, giving the contestants "relatable feedback" and offering encouraging words about their performances.

Solos:

July 18, 2016
Derulo was unavailable this week, but all-star Stephen "tWitch" Boss took his place at the judging table; Ziegler continued to attend and comment at the contestants' rehearsals. The show opened with a group Bollywood-style number danced by all of the contestants and all-stars. In the middle of the show, the all-stars performed a piece inspired by Romeo and Juliet. Contestants were paired with each other to dance two routines; each dancer performed at least one routine outside of his or her primary style. The kids also performed duets with their all-stars.  Daniela and her partner Sheaden were ranked in the bottom two, based on the previous week's voting, and Daniela was eliminated.

Duets choreographed by all-stars:

July 25, 2016 (final 9)
The show began again with a dance that included all the contestants and all-stars.  During the course of the broadcast, there was also a group number for the kids and later one for the all-stars. The remaining nine contestants performed full-length routines with their all-stars in their own primary styles (or similar styles), and each did a short solo in his or her primary style. The kids each gave a campaign speech as if they were running for US president. Tate McRae, who is Canadian, quipped in her speech: "The only wall that should be shared between Canada and the United States should be Travis Wall." Sheaden was eliminated, based on the previous week's voting. The show has been promoting the sixth annual National Dance Day, "an annual celebration that encourages Americans to embrace dance as a fun and positive way to maintain good health and combat obesity", which is scheduled to take place on Saturday, July 30, 2016.

Solos:

August 1, 2016 (final 8)
The show began with a group toy-themed hip-hop routine for all of the contestants and all-stars.  Later, all 10 all-stars danced a contemporary routine based on a snow-globe. Each of the contestants danced a routine in their primary style with their all-star and then paired with another contestant for a routine in a new genre. Jake and Jordan were eliminated, based on the previous week's voting.

Contestant duets

August 22, 2016 (final 6)
The show began with a group contemporary routine for all of the contestants and all-stars.  Later, four of the female all-stars danced a contemporary routine, and Comfort and the five male all-stars danced a hip-hop number.  Each of the contestants danced a routine in their primary style with their all-star, paired with another contestant for a routine in a new genre, and also performed a short solo dance in their own genre. Ruby was eliminated, based on the previous week's voting.

Contestant duets

Solos:

August 29, 2016 (final 5)
The show began with a group routine for all of the contestants and all-stars. Each of the contestants then danced with his or her all-star in their primary style. Two groups of  all-stars danced separately: first a contemporary routine and then a Broadway number. In the second half of the show, the contestants each choreographed a duet with his or her all-star in their own genre, choosing the concept, music, costumes and make-up. Finally, judge Maddie Ziegler performed a dramatic contemporary routine paired with choreographer Travis Wall. Tahani was eliminated based on the previous week's voting.

Duets choreographed by the contestants

September 5, 2016 (final 4): No elimination
The final four competed on Labor Day.  Audience voting after this show was combined with the votes from the August 29 show to determine the results of the season, so there was no elimination this week. The show again opened with a group number for the remaining contestants and the all-stars. The four contestants danced another routine, and later so did the all-stars.  Each contestant performed a duet with an all-star who was not his or her mentor, in a new genre, and each also danced a solo in his or her own genre. Finally, the contestants each reprised their favorite routine of the season with their usual all-stars.

Solos:

September 12, 2016: Finale – Results
The episode began with a group dance for all the contestants and all-stars that began with the Top 4 contestants waking up and getting ready for the big day. There were also new group dances for the hip-hop finalists and their all-stars; the ballroom finalists and their all-stars; and the contemporary finalists (plus Emma) and their all stars. In addition, there was a new group routine for all the finalists plus Maddie Ziegler, and Cat Deely chose to reprise her favorite all-stars routine. During the course of the broadcast, each of the Top 4 reprised their favorite solo of the season, each judge chose two favorite routines to see again, each of the all-stars chose a favorite duet to reprise, and other duets were reprised as described below. Results were announced during the last hour of the show as follows: Emma placed 4th, Tate was 3rd, J. T. was runner-up, and Kida won the $250,000 top prize and will be featured on the cover of Dance Spirit magazine.

Solos (contestants' choice):

Ratings

U.S. Nielsen ratings

Notes: 
July 4, 2016: broadcast was a rerun of academy #2.
August 8, 2016: broadcast was a rerun of Top 9 Perform + Elimination.
August 15, 2016: broadcast was a rerun of Top 8 Perform + Elimination.

See also
 List of So You Think You Can Dance finalists

References

External links
 Episode 1
 All-star group number, Episode 6
 Top 10 group number, Episode 6
 Maddie Ziegler and Travis Wall duet, Episode 11

2016 American television seasons
So You Think You Can Dance (American TV series)